Kiersten Nicolla Dale Warren is an American actress. Her best known roles include Alex Tabor on Saved by the Bell: The College Years and Nora Huntington on Desperate Housewives.

Life and career
Warren is the mother of actress Misti Traya, who has a daughter. Warren is now married to actor Kirk Acevedo. In 2009, she appeared in an episode of Fringe ("Unleashed") as the wife of Charlie Francis, Acevedo's character. In 2003, she appeared in an episode of The West Wing titled "Life on Mars", and in 2009, appeared in an episode of Nip/Tuck titled "Jenny Juggs" as Jenny Juggs.

She has appeared in numerous films, including 13 Going on 30, Intolerable Cruelty, Divine Secrets of the Ya-Ya Sisterhood, Bicentennial Man and Independence Day.

Filmography

Film

Television

References

External links
 
 
 Interview with TheStarScoop.com, October 2006

Actresses from Iowa
American film actresses
American television actresses
Living people
20th-century American actresses
21st-century American actresses
Year of birth missing (living people)